Ben Lane is a professional rugby league footballer who plays as a  or  for St Helens (Heritage № 1279) in the Betfred Super League.

Lane made his first team début for Saints in August 2022 against Wakefield Trinity.

References

External links
St Helens profile
Saints Heritage Society profile

2004 births
Living people
English rugby league players
Rugby league players from Widnes
Rugby league halfbacks
St Helens R.F.C. players